Howard Xavier Hinds (born October 29, 1977) is a Curaçao former swimmer, who specialized in sprint freestyle and butterfly events. He is a two-time Olympian (1996 and 2000), and a member of the Fort Lauderdale Swim Team, under head coach Jack Nelson.

Hinds made his official debut for the Netherlands Antilles at the 1996 Summer Olympics in Atlanta. He failed to reach the top 16 final in the 50 m freestyle, finishing only in fifty-fourth place at 24.63.

At the 2000 Summer Olympics in Sydney, Hinds competed only in a sprint freestyle double. He achieved FINA B-standards of 23.88 (50 m freestyle) and 52.58 (100 m freestyle) from the Pan American Games in Winnipeg, Manitoba, Canada. In the 100 m freestyle, Hinds placed fifty-first on the morning prelims. Swimming in heat three, he fell short to a second seed, from start to finish, in a lifetime best of 52.52, clipping 0.06 seconds off his entry time, but finishing just behind Uzbekistan's Ravil Nachaev, the winner of his heat, by three-tenths of a second (0.30). Two days later, in the 50 m freestyle, Hinds pulled off again a second seed and fifty-second overall in the same heat at 24.07, nearly half a second (0.50) behind Costa Rica's Estebán Blanco.

References

1977 births
Living people
Dutch Antillean male freestyle swimmers
Olympic swimmers of the Netherlands Antilles
Swimmers at the 1996 Summer Olympics
Swimmers at the 1999 Pan American Games
Swimmers at the 2000 Summer Olympics
Swimmers at the 2003 Pan American Games
Pan American Games competitors for the Netherlands Antilles
People from Willemstad
Curaçao male freestyle swimmers